805 Squadron was a Royal Australian Navy Fleet Air Arm squadron. Originally formed as 805 Naval Air Squadron of the Royal Navy Fleet Air Arm in 1940 and operating for the duration of World War II in both the Mediterranean and Pacific theatres. 805 Squadron was recreated as a unit of the Royal Australian Navy (RAN) in 1948, and operated from Australian aircraft carriers until 1982, having the distinction of being the last fast jet squadron in the RAN. 805 Squadron was re-established in 2001 to operate the Kaman Super Seasprite as a replacement for helicopters currently in service, but problems with the helicopters saw the project cancelled and the squadron disbanded in 2008.

History

Royal Navy
805 Squadron was first formed as a Royal Navy Fleet Air Arm squadron in November 1940 at the RAF aerodrome at Abukir in Egypt. Operating Fairey Fulmars in a convoy protection role, the squadron operated in the Western Desert until January 1941, when it transferred to Crete. A short time later, it returned to Egypt, where at Dekeila it re-equipped with Brewster Buffalo fighters. In June 1941, these were replaced by the Grumman Martlet III. The squadron disbanded in January 1943. The squadron recommissioned in the UK for service in the Pacific Campaign, equipped with Supermarine Seafires, but saw no further service prior to the end of the war.

Royal Australian Navy

In August 1948, 805 Squadron was reformed as a Royal Australian Navy FAA squadron operating Hawker Sea Fury Mk II aircraft. During September 1951, 805 Squadron deployed to Korea, flying sorties for 64 days. Three 805 Squadron pilots were killed during the campaign. The battle honour "Korea 1951–52" was awarded to the squadron for this deployment. Following the retirement of the Sea Fury aircraft, the unit was disbanded on 26 March 1958.

The squadron was again disbanded on 30 June 1963 and its aircraft transferred to B Flight, 816 Squadron.

On 10 January 1968, 805 Squadron reformed, equipped with the McDonnell Douglas A-4G Skyhawk fighter. The VF-805 designation was used to conform with USN squadron naming system during the Skyhawk era, under which 'VF' referred to fixed wing fighter aircraft, denoting the fleet defence role of the squadron's aircraft. The squadron operated from Melbourne until 1982.

On 28 February 2001, 805 Squadron was reformed, equipped with Kaman SH-2G(A) Super Seasprite helicopters to be operated from the new s. The Squadron completed First of Class Flight Trials aboard HMAS Parramatta, but did not reach operational status due to difficulties with integrating the helicopters' avionic systems. Following technical problems with the new helicopter, the squadron was relegated to minimal duties in 2005, grounded in 2006, and faced possible scrapping in early 2007. Efforts to rectify the technical problems were not successful and the project was cancelled in early 2008. As a result, 805 Squadron was disbanded on 26 June 2008.

Aircraft

RN service
Fairey Fulmar
Brewster Buffalo
Grumman Martlett III
Supermarine Seafire (Strike)

RAN service
Hawker Sea Fury Mk II
de Havilland Sea Venom FAW.53
McDonnell Douglas A4G Skyhawk
Kaman SH-2 Seasprite

References

External links
RAN website on 805 Squadron's history

Flying squadrons of the Royal Australian Navy
Military units and formations of Australia in the Korean War
Military units and formations established in 1940
Military units and formations disestablished in 2008